Lin Yi-han (16 March 1991 – 27 April 2017) was a Taiwanese writer.

Life 
Lin Yi-han studied at the National Tainan Girls' Senior High School. Her father is a famous dermatologist in Tainan. Throughout her life, she had studied in university twice, first at Taipei Medical University studying medicine, then at National Chengchi University majoring in Chinese literature. She didn't finish her study, as she quit after 14 days and 3 years respectively.

Lin married in 2016, and committed suicide at her apartment in Taipei on April 27, 2017, shortly after the publication of her first and only complete novel Fang Si-Qi's First Love Paradise (房思琪的初戀樂園), which tells a story of a teenage girl being sexually abused by her tutor. There's been speculation that the protagonist in this novel implies back to Lin herself, although Lin had denied it publicly.

Lin became melancholic after 17 years-old, and had attempted suicide three times in following years, making public believe that the misfortune that befalls the main character of her sole novel may be based on the lasting effect of sexual assault that she might have experienced in her lifetime. She had asserted before, "every day there are only 3 things which come into my mind, whether I should eat, take sedative, or take my life!"

After Lin's death, the government established a law requiring the identities of tutors at cram schools to be accessible to the public.  Lin's parents accused Chen Guo Xing of sexual assault against their daughter, but lacking physical evidence, Chen was not charged with a crime.

References 

21st-century Taiwanese women writers
Writers from Tainan
Suicides by hanging in Taiwan
1991 births
2017 suicides